Ephraim J. Reel was a U.S. politician, who was the ninth Mayor of Orlando from 1885 to 1887.

References

Mayors of Orlando, Florida
Year of birth unknown
Year of death unknown